Jacqueline Lucienne Marie-Louise Marguerite Elledge (born 8 January 1937) is an English former cricketer who played primarily as a batter. She appeared in 3 Test matches for England in 1963, in a series against Australia. She played domestic cricket for Kent.

Elledge was educated at Wolverhampton Girls' High School, where she played in the cricket team alongside Rachael Heyhoe Flint and Ann Jago.

References

External links
 
 

1937 births
Living people
Cricketers from Wolverhampton
People educated at Wolverhampton Girls' High School
England women Test cricketers
Kent women cricketers